Hemidactylus makolowodei is a species of African gecko, a lizard in the family Gekkonidae.

Etymology
The specific name, makolowodei, is in honor of Central African herpetologist Paul Makalowode.

Geographic range
As of 2018, H. makolowodei is endemic to Cameroon, although its range is likely to extend into Nigeria.

Habitat
The preferred habitat of H. makolowodei is forest.

Description
Dorsally, it is purplish. The male has 45 precloacal-femoral pores.

Reproduction
H. makolowodei is oviparous.

References

Further reading
Bauer, Aaron M.; Lebreton, Matthew; Chirio, Laurent; Ineich, Ivan; Talla Kouete, Marcell (2006). "New species of Hemidactylus (Squamata: Gekkonidae) from Cameroon". African Journal of Herpetology 55 (2): 83–93. (Hemidactylus makolowodei, new species).

Hemidactylus
Reptiles described in 2006
Reptiles of Cameroon
Endemic fauna of Cameroon